This is a list of airlines of Newfoundland and Labrador which have an air operator's certificate issued by the Civil Aviation Authority of Canada.

Current airlines

Defunct airlines

References

Newfoundland and Labrador
Aviation in Newfoundland and Labrador
Airlines